VovaZiLvova, born Volodymyr Parfeniuk 30 December 1983, is a Ukrainian hip hop and rap performer.

Biography 
Volodymyr Parfeniuk was born in Lviv on 30 December 1983.  In 2006 he became the anchorman of the hip hop show VovaZiL’vova on a channel M1. That year his first album "Вино Кобіти Патіфон" was released.  In October 2007, his album "ЙОЙ #1" was released. Vova performs in Ukrainian language sometimes with addition of English words.

Discography 
* Wine, Ladies, Gramophone (2006) 1. The good old boom box
 2. VovaZiL'vova» (Max Chorny rmx)
 3. Hurry up and Live
 4. Everything is going to be alright
 5. Hot Dances
 6. Compote
 7. Why I love Summer
 8. What I need to be happy
 9. Good girls
 10. For you
 11. Spiritual is bigger
 12. Song about grass
 13. Childhood Dreams
 14. I see a dream
 15. (My Hood) Sykhiv
 16. I am calm * VovaZiL'vova Presents Yoy #1 (2007)  1. Intro
 2. Everything is going to be alright (dirty south rmx) feat. Trim Throw
 3. Change the world for the better feat. Insane, Alinka
 4. When she is with me
 5. Know who feat. NP Gerik, Matt Quota
 6. Harem feat. Max Chorny, Kishe
 7. Vova is gangsta!
 8. I luv n **** z!
 9. My game (rmx) feat. NP Gerik
 10. New life
 11. Mama feat. Fame
 12. Stranger (bossa version) feat. Gnatkovski
13. I am myself hater feat. NaVidminuVid, DaHok
 14. Know us feat. Taras P3S A#3, Aybolit
 15. Night Lviv
 16. Not such as I want feat. Kishe
 17. Stranger (r&b version) feat. Gnatkovski
 18. Con solo un beso feat. Adrian Garcia
 19. Outro * VovaZiL'vova Presents Yoy #2 (2012)  1. VovaZiL'vova - Intro (2008)
 2. VovaZiL'vova - My Territory (2008)
 3. VovaZiL'vova - Too many TV series (2008)
 4. Snake G, Muza, VovaZiL'vova - It'll just come (part III) (2008)
 5. VovaZiL'vova, 4FRONT, DaHok - Spirit of the West (2008)
 6. El Paso, VovaZiL'vova - Step forward (2009)
 7. Hun, VovaZiL'vova - The other side of the paradise (2009)
 8. Climate, VovaZiL'vova - Breath of God (2010)
 9. C4 VovaZiL'vova - The way back home (2009)
 10. Docki Dock, VovaZiL'vova - There where you are (2010)
 11. Qube Unite, VovaZiL'vova - Sweet (2011)
 12. Rolliks, VovaZiL'vova - Sad life story (2009)
13. VovaZiL'vova, Ivan Dorn - Atata (ReNeBe) (VovKING RMX) (2011)
 14. MLLM, VovaZiL'vova - Come up (2010)
 15. DJ BRK, Jarecki, VovaZiL'vova - Fenomenal (2008)
 16. Adrian Garcia, VovaZiL'vova - Mi Negra (2009)
17.	Mirami ft. VZL, Mitik Porishay — Sexual Madness (2010) * Beautiful other (2013) ''
 1. I used to sit down and write
 2. Atata (renebe) (feat. Ivan Dorn)
 3. I don't do rap
 4. I love rap (involving Kryzhyk and Master)
 5. Beloved
 6. Good that you exist
 7. Give me the kiss
 8. So many thoughts
 9. Rich kids (feat. NP Gerik and Mitik Porishay)
 10. When I drink champagne
 11. I don't strain
 12. New day feat, Gnatkovski

References 
 Official site
 VovaZiL’vova on site M1.tv

1983 births
Ukrainian musical groups
Living people
Ukrainian rappers